The 2008 NORCECA Beach Volleyball Circuit at Guatemala was held April 16–21, 2008 in Guatemala City, Guatemala. It was the second leg of the NORCECA Beach Volleyball Circuit 2008.

Women's competition

Men's competition

References
 Norceca

Guatemala
Norceca Beach Volleyball Circuit (Guatemala), 2008
International volleyball competitions hosted by Guatemala